The Austin A35 is a small family car that was sold by Austin from 1956 until 1968. About 280,897 A35s of all types were produced.

Design
Introduced in 1956, it replaced the highly successful Austin A30.  The name reflected the larger and more powerful 34 hp (25 kW) A-Series inline-four engine, enabling a slightly higher top speed and better acceleration.

The A35 is very similar in appearance to the A30, except for a larger rear window aperture and a painted front grille, with chrome horse-shoe surround, instead of the chrome grille  on the A30. Both have  wheels. The semaphore turn-signal indicators were replaced with modern front- and rear-mounted flashing lights. A slightly easier to operate remote-control gear-change was provided. Much of the improved performance is a result of different gearbox ratios. The A30 has the first three ratios close together then a big gap to top (fourth gear). The A35's ratios are better spaced and give a higher speed in third gear.

Like the A30, the A35 was offered as a two- or four-door saloon and two-door "Countryman" estate and also as a van. The latter model continued in production through to 1968.  A rare coupe utility (pickup) version was also produced in 1956, with just 477 sold. Drawings were made for a sports tourer, but no prototype was actually built.

The A35 passenger cars were replaced by the new body shape A40 Farina models in 1959 but the estate car version continued until 1962 and van until 1968.

Performance

Referring to the A35,  from  Staton Abbey (1969?). The Book of the Austin A30 and A35. Pitman Press: p 148.

"...The new cars were thoroughly proved by tests carried out on the German autobahnen, during which drivers of much larger cars were astonished to be passed by three small Austins which were being driven flat out all day, averaging 60 mph for 25000 miles!..."

".....a privately-owned works-tuned A35 was driven for seven days around the Montlhéry track, near Paris, in a record-breaking run at an average speed of 75 mph, covering nearly 12500 miles...."

With standard fit of drums all round, in both the A30 and the A35, the front hydraulic with rear hydro-mechanical brakes (the hydraulics acted upon the hand brake at the rear) needed regular adjustment to keep the stopping distances reasonably short.

The A35 was quite successful in 1950s saloon car racing, until supplanted by the Farina A40, but some still appear in historic events.

In recent years a special Academy class of racing has been introduced by the HRDC (Historic Racing Drivers Club), featuring A30 and A35 saloons. These cars feature sealed  Marina engines, and are a restricted class, meaning that owners are limited to a specific range of parts from specified suppliers.

Production

Saloons A2S5: (two-door) 100,284,
 Saloons AS5: (four-door) 28,961,
 Saloons Total: 129,245
Van & Countryman, AV5 & AP5:  138,356
 Van AV6: 13,222
 Countryman AP6: 74
 Van AV8 (1098cc): 45,685
 Van AV8 (848cc): 14,230
 Pick-up: 477
 CKD (completely knocked down) 13,320
 Total: 354,609

Engines
 1956–62 - 948 cc A-Series I4, 34 hp (25 kW) at 4,750 rpm and 50 lb·ft (68 Nm) at 2,000 rpm
 1962–66 - 1,098 cc A-Series I4, 55 hp (41 kW) at 5,500 rpm and 61 lb·ft (83 Nm) at 2,500 rpm (van)
 1963–68 -  848 cc  A-Series I4, 34 hp (25 kW) at 5500rpm and 44 lb·ft (60 N·m) at 2,900rpm (van)

In popular culture
The A35 van featured in two Wallace & Gromit films: A Matter of Loaf and Death and The Curse of the Were-Rabbit.

References

Further reading
 Post War Baby Austins (1988) Sharratt, Barney 
 Austin A30 & A35 Super Profile (1985), Henson, Kim, Haynes Publishing Group 
 Austin A30 & A35 1951 - 1962, Brooklands Books, 
 Allen, Michael (1985). British Family Cars of the Fifties. Haynes Publishing Group. .

External links

 Austin Memories—History of Austin and Longbridge
 Austin A30/A35 Owners' Club

A35
1950s cars
1960s cars
Cars introduced in 1956
Cars discontinued in 1968
Rear-wheel-drive vehicles
Sedans
Station wagons